Mohammed Issa Nuristani (or Issa Khan Nuristan) was an army general and a community leader among the Safed Posh tribe in Nuristan, Afghanistan, who led a group of Nuristani people in rebellion against the Soviets at the start of the Soviet–Afghan War. He was assassinated early in the conflict.

He was born in 1957. As of 1975 he served as the Commander of the Central Army Corps.

References

Nuristani people
Afghan tribal leaders
Mujahideen members of the Soviet–Afghan War
Year of death missing
1957 births